Euphrosyne acerosa, commonly known as copperweed, is a species of plant in the family Asteraceae. It is native to the south-western United States (California (Inyo Co), Nevada (Nye Co), Utah, western Colorado, Arizona and north-western New Mexico).

References

Flora of the Southwestern United States
Heliantheae